Chiloglanis cameronensis is a species of upside-down catfish native to Cameroon, Equatorial Guinea and Gabon where they are found in the coastal rivers.  This species grows to a length of  TL.

References

External links 

cameronensis
Freshwater fish of Africa
Fish of Cameroon
Fish of Equatorial Guinea
Fish of Gabon
Taxa named by George Albert Boulenger
Fish described in 1904